Market Street Historic District is a national historic district located at Potsdam in St. Lawrence County, New York.  The district includes 27 contributing buildings dated from 1820 to 1900.  The district encompasses the extant 19th century commercial core of the village.

It was listed on the National Register of Historic Places in 1979.

Gallery

See also
National Register of Historic Places listings in St. Lawrence County, New York

References

External links

Historic districts on the National Register of Historic Places in New York (state)
Historic districts in St. Lawrence County, New York
National Register of Historic Places in St. Lawrence County, New York
1820 establishments in New York (state)